Enrique Sorrel Contreras (3 February 1912 – 26 October 1991) was a Chilean footballer and manager.

He won two unbeaten titles with Colo-Colo as player (1937 and 1941) and was decorated by Chilean president Pedro Aguirre Cerda, recognizing his services as a national team player during the 1939 South American Championship at Lima with a medal for the merit.

Honours

Club

Player
Colo-Colo
 Primera División de Chile (4): 1937, 1939, 1941, 1947
 Copa Chile (2): 1938, 1940

Manager

Club
Colo-Colo
 Primera División de Chile: 1947

San Luis Quillota
 Primera División de Chile: 1955

References

1912 births
1991 deaths
Chilean Primera División players
Audax Italiano footballers
Colo-Colo footballers
Chilean football managers
Chilean Primera División managers
Primera B de Chile managers
Colo-Colo managers
San Luis de Quillota managers
Association football midfielders
Chilean footballers
Chile international footballers
People from Linares